Chris Devins is an artist/urban planner from Chicago, Illinois who engages in placemaking, which blends Art and Urban Planning. He is the creator of several outdoor Art initiatives in the Chicago area, including  Hyde Park Heroes, the Pullman Project (Briscoe 2015 p.A4), Chatham 2.0 (Mwachukwu 2016 p. 1) and most notably, Bronzeville Legends (Cholke 2014 p. 2).

He came under scrutiny in April, 2017 when he admitted to using an image created by Rhode Island art student Gelila Mesfin  for a mural of former first lady Michelle Obama  Devins raised $12,000 with  the gofundme campaign for the creation of a mural, causing many negative news stories and social media pressure.

References

People involved in plagiarism controversies
Painters from Illinois
21st-century American painters
American muralists
American urban planners
Living people
Artists from Chicago
Place of birth missing (living people)
American male painters
Year of birth missing (living people)